Marius Asak Gullerud (born 20 February 1977) is a Norwegian football midfielder.

He started his career in Skjetten SK and joined Kongsvinger IL ahead of the 1997 season. After 112 league games for the club, he went on to Hamarkameratene in 2002. In 2011, he joined fourth-tier club Flisbyen BK.

References

1977 births
Living people
People from Skedsmo
People from Lørenskog
Norwegian footballers
Skjetten SK players
Kongsvinger IL Toppfotball players
Hamarkameratene players
Eliteserien players
Association football midfielders
Sportspeople from Viken (county)